Major General Richard Stewart Dobbs (10 May 1808 – 26 September 1888), son of Rev. Richard Stewart Dobbs and Harriet Macauley, was a British civil servant. He served as the first Superintendent of Chittledroog (Chitradurga) Division, in the princely state of Mysuru (Mysore), British India, from 1834 to 1861. Tumakuru was the then headquarters of this division. He subsequently rose to the rank of Major-General in the 9th Regiment of the Madras Native Infantry
 A small town, Dobbspet, located in the Nelamangala taluk of Bengaluru district, is named after him.

One of the major successes during his administration, as he has recorded in his reminiscences, was that he was completely successful in nabbing most of the professional robbers (Lambanis, Koramas and Korachas) in the Chitradurga - Tumakuru region, and ridding this province of this social menace. 

He was a shikari and would hunt in and around Devarayanadurga hill and forests. He wrote of the presence of sambur (which the British of that time referred to as elk) near the Devarayanadurga hill top, apart from tigers in the forests around the hill. According to Dobbs, an entire dead blackbuck would be available at the Tumakuru market for four annas (approximately 25 paise or 1/4 of an Indian Rupee). This common antelope was so abundant in the areas surrounding Devarayanadurga, that one British officer shot 200 of these magnificent creatures within a few days.

He devised a new method of trapping tigers of which there plenty in the region those days. British officers also indulged in ‘pig-sticking’ or spear hunting of wild boar as well as shooting sloth bears in the division. He narrates that the reduction of tigers and leopards in the division due to hunting led to an increase in wild boar which damaged sugarcane plantations. A tiger that was killed about four miles from Tumakuru city was skinned and the skin was gifted to a family friend in Scotland.

He was a devout Christian who supported missionary activity and was equally enchanted by the wildlife and serenity atop Devarayanadurga hill. Though he himself did not have the gift of song, he always enjoyed the singing of hymns by his guests when sitting with them atop the hill while watching the beautiful sunsets. The bungalow he built atop the hill is now being used as a police wireless communication centre.

Personal life 
He was married to Jane Margaret Cathcart (15 April 1811 – 24 January 1892), daughter of Robert Cathcart on 18 April 1834. The couple had eleven children: eight sons, Richard Stewart Dobbs (d. 1908), Robert Cathcart Dobbs (1835 – 1914), Francis Hugh Dobbs (1838 – 1857), Alexander Fairlie Dobbs (1839 – 1912), Col. Charles Alfred Dobbs (1843 – 1871),  Rev. Arthur Macaulay Dobbs (1845 – 1889), Edward Dobbs (1847 – 1918) & George Cadell Dobbs (1849 - 1925), and three daughters, Annie Dobbs, Harriet Dobbs and Jane Margaret Dobbs (1852 – 1910).

His mortal remains have been interred in the Redford Cemetery, Greystones, County Wicklow, Ireland. His epitaph reads:

"Soldier of Christ, well done 
Praise be thy new employ 
And while eternal ages run 
Rest in thy saviour's joy"

See also 
 Bangalore Division
 Bayalu Seeme
 Kenneth Anderson (writer)

References

Other References 

1808 births
1888 deaths